Nadia Bulkin is an Indonesian-American political scientist and author of short stories, largely in the horror genre.

Biography
Bulkin was born in Indonesia to a Muslim father and Christian mother. Her parents decided to leave Indonesia soon after the death of Suharto. She moved to Nebraska with her family when she was 11.

She graduated summa cum laude from Barnard College with a degree in political science before earning her master's at American University's School of International Service.

Bulkin currently works as a consultant in Washington, D.C. She is a senior associate at The Asia Group, a strategy and capital advisory group.

Short stories by Bulkin have been published in ChiZine, Strange Horizons, Three-lobed Burning Eye, and the Simon Strantzas-edited anthology Aickman's Heirs.

Awards and recognition
In 2018, she was nominated in the Shirley Jackson Awards for both short fiction ("Live Through This") and Single-Author Collection (She Said Destroy, Word Horde, 2017).

References

External links
 

1987 births
American horror writers
American women political scientists
American political scientists
American University School of International Service alumni
American women short story writers
Barnard College alumni
Living people
People from Jakarta
Writers from Nebraska
Indonesian emigrants to the United States
21st-century American women